The Ghana national football team represents Ghana in men's international football, doing it since 1957. The team consists of twenty players including the technical team. The team is nicknamed the Black Stars after the Black Star of Africa in the flag of Ghana. It is governed by the Ghana Football Association (GFA) the governing body for football in Ghana and the oldest football association in Africa (founded in 1920). Prior to 1957, the team played as the Gold Coast. The team is a member of both FIFA and CAF.

Ghana qualified for the FIFA World Cup for the first time in 2006. The team has won the Africa Cup of Nations four times (1963, 1965, 1978, and 1982), while finishing as runners-up five times (1968, 1970, 1992, 2010, and 2015). After going through 2005 unbeaten, the Ghana national football team won the FIFA Best Mover of the Year Award and reached the second round of the 2006 FIFA World Cup. At the 2010 FIFA World Cup in South Africa, they became only the third African team to reach the World Cup quarter-finals, and in 2014 they competed in their third consecutive World Cup.

History

On 19 August 1962 at the Accra Sports Stadium, they played Real Madrid, who were at the time Spanish champions, former European champions and intercontinental champions, and drew 3–3.

Charles Kumi Gyamfi became coach in 1961, and they won successive African Cup of Nations titles, in 1963 and 1965, and achieved its record win, 13–2 away to Kenya, after the second of these. They reached the final of the tournament in 1968 and 1970, losing 1–0 on each occasion, to DR Congo and Sudan respectively. Their domination of this tournament earned them the nickname "the Black Stars of Africa" in the 1960s.

They failed to qualify for 3 successive African Cup of Nations in the 1970s, and qualified for the Olympic Games football tournaments, becoming the first team from sub-Saharan Africa to qualify for the Games, reaching the quarter-finals in 1964 and withdrawing after qualifying in 1976 and 1980. They later won the 1982 African Cup of Nations. After 3 failures to reach the tournament final, the 1992 African Cup of Nations saw it finish second.

Prior to the year 2000, disharmony among the squad which led to parliamentary and executive intervention to settle issues between 2 squad members, Abedi Pele and Tony Yeboah in the 1990s, may have played some part in the failure of the team to build on the successes of the national underage teams in the 1990s, and a generation of Black Stars players who went to the 2001 FIFA World Youth Championship final became the "core" of the team at the 2002 African Cup of Nations, and were undefeated for a year in 2005 and reached the final tournament of the 2006 FIFA World Cup. The Black Stars started by succumbing to a 2–0 defeat to eventual champions Italy, and wins over Czech Republic (2–0) and United States (2–1) saw it through to the second round, where it lost 3–0 to Brazil.

Under head coach Milovan Rajevac, the Black Stars went on to secure a 100% record in its qualification campaign, winning the group and becoming the first African team to qualify for the 2010 FIFA World Cup. In the final tournament, it is in Group D with Germany, Serbia and Australia. It reached the round of 16 where it played the United States, winning 2–1 in extra time to become the third African nation to reach the World Cup quarter-finals. It then lost to Uruguay in a penalty shootout in the quarter-finals, having missed a penalty kick in extra time after what would have been the winning goal to send Ghana to the semi-finals was prevented by Luis Suárez's handball, who was then shown a red card for his actions.

In 2013 it became the only team in Africa to reach 4 consecutive semi-finals of the CAF Africa Cup of Nations twice, the first time since between 1963 and 1970.

It was sufficiently ranked by FIFA to start its qualifying for the 2014 World Cup in the Second round. It won the group, and in the following round qualified for the 2014 World Cup finals in November 2013, beating Egypt  7–3 on aggregate in a 2-legged play-off. It was drawn in Group G for the finals, where it faced Germany, Portugal, and the United States. It exited in the group stages recording 1 draw and was the only team to not lose to Germany in the tournament.

In the 2015 Africa Cup of Nations, it reached the final, to be denied the title on penalties against Ivory Coast. While its 2017 Africa Cup of Nations campaign ended in a 4th-place finish - the third one in 4 consecutive editions of the tournament - in the qualifiers for the 2018 World Cup, it finished behind Egypt and Uganda in their final group. At the 2019 Africa Cup of Nations, it was eliminated by Tunisia in the Round of 16. In 2021, Rajevac was brought back, and the team ended up failing to win a match at the 2022 Africa Cup of Nations where it lost 2–3 to debutants the Comoros after an André Ayew red card to finish bottom of its group and thus fail to progress beyond the group stage for the first time since 2006. It drew 0–0 vs Nigeria and drew 1–1 in Nigeria to qualify for the 2022 FIFA World Cup on the away goals rule.

Team image

Kits and crest 

Adopted following the independence of Ghana in 1957, the black star has been included in its kits. The Black Stars kits were sponsored by Puma SE from 2005, with the deal ending in 2014.

The Black Star kit is used instead of the original gold, green, and red coloured association football kit based on the colors of the Ghana flag. The Black Stars have used an all-white and partly black kit which was worn from the years 1957 to 1989 and from 2006 until December 2014.

Between 1990 and 2006 the Ghana national 3 team used the kit in the colours of the national flag of Ghana, with gold, green and red used, as in the team's crest and also known as the Pan-African colours. The gold with green and red kit concept and design was used in the 60s and 70s, and designed with gold and green vertical stripes and red shoulders. An all black second kit was introduced in 2008 and in 2015, Black Stars' gold-red-green coloured kit and all black coloured kit is to be reassigned to the position of 1st and 2nd kits following the induction of a brown with blue and gold coloured Black Stars 3rd kit in 2012.

The team's kit for the 2014 FIFA World Cup was ranked as the best kit of the tournament by BuzzFeed.

 Kit suppliers 

Grounds

There is no fixed home stadium. World Cup and Africa Cup of Nations qualifying matches have been played at the Sekondi-Takoradi Stadium in Sekondi-Takoradi, the Len Clay Stadium, Kumasi Sports Stadium and Abrankese Stadium in Kumasi, the Cape Coast Sports Stadium in Cape Coast, the Accra Sports Stadium in the Accra and the Tamale Stadium in Tamale. Some smaller, regional stadia (stadiums) were used in the 2002 Africa Cup of Nations qualifying and 2004 African Cup of Nations qualification qualifying campaigns.

The training facilities and training grounds are located at Agyeman Badu Stadium, Berekum Sports Stadium in Brong-Ahafo, the Tema Sports Stadium in Tema and the multi-functional Lizzy Sports Complex in Legon.

Organization and finance
The Black Stars had no official head because of "corrupt" practices by the then president, Kwesi Nyantakyi. and vice-president George Afriyie, with Frank Davis as director of football, and Edward Bawa as treasurer. The Ghana Football Association (GFA) signed a CN¥92.2 million (US$15 million) deal with Ghanaian state-run oil and gas exploration corporation, Ghana National Petroleum Corporation (GNPC), to sponsor the Black Stars and the renewable contract saw the oil and gas exploration corporation become the global headline sponsor of the Black Stars, with a yearly Black Stars player salary wage bill, following the gold mining corporations Ashanti Goldfields Corporation and Goldfields Ghana Limited (GGL), which had been sponsoring the Black Stars since 2005.

On 28 August 2013, Ghana Football Association (GFA) launched a TV channel and named GFA TV. The channel has the exclusive rights to broadcast all the Black Stars' matches. In November 2013, the Black Stars signed a 2013–2015 CN¥30.6 million (US$5 million) and an additional classified multi-million private bank sponsorship deal with the Ghanaian state-run private banking institution UniBank.

Supporters

The Black Stars maintain an average stadium match attendance of 60,000+ and a match attendance high of 80,000+, such as in the case of its 2010 FIFA World Cup quarter-final against Uruguay in which was attended by 84,017 spectators.
Ghana's match against England on 29 March 2011 had the largest away following for any association football national team since the re-opening of Wembley Stadium in 2007. The match was watched by 700 million people around the world.

Following the team's appearances at the 2006 and 2010 World Cup tournaments they were greeted by some hundred avid fans dancing and singing at Kotoka International Airport in Accra.

Rivalries

A rivalry is with the Super Eagles, the Nigeria national team. The "Battle of Supremacy on the Gulf of Guinea" is between 2 of the "most successful teams on the African continent". The proximity of the 2 countries to each other, a dispute between the different association football competitions and wider diplomatic competition for influence across West Africa add to this rivalry. The match between these 2 countries is called the Jollof derby.

Media and arts
Match schedules are broadcast in English as in the case of inter-continental matches and in Akan nationally by Adom TV, PeaceFM, AdomFM and HappyFM. During the scheduled qualification for the 2014 World Cup national broadcaster GTV, a sub-division of the Ghana Broadcasting Corporation (GBC), broadcast to the Ghanaian public home qualifiers with away qualifiers broadcast by the satellite television broadcasting corporation Viasat 1. The friendly match against Turkey in August 2013 was televised by Viasat 1 and the qualifiers for the 2015 Africa Cup of Nations and the 2018 Inter-Continental Championships are scheduled for public broadcast by the corporations GFA TV, GBC and Viasat 1.

Products including books, documentary films, Azonto dances and songs have been made in the name of the team. These may be intended with commercial motives and are focused on previous and future World Cups or Africa Cup of Nations tournaments.

 Books: books have been published on the team's history and participation in tournaments. These include Ghana, The Rediscovered Soccer Might: Watch Out World!, about the history and performance of the Black Stars and association football national teams that the Black Stars have played against, and The Black Stars of Ghana by Alan Whelan; about Black Stars commencing their progress through the final rounds of the 2010 World Cup and into the quarter-finals.
 Documentary films: In 2010 Miracle Films Ghana Limited showcased a vintage documentary film picture, Kwame Nkrumah & Ghana's Black Stars, about Osagyefo Kwame Nkrumah "Africa's man of the 2nd millennium" and "Pan-African pioneer", who invested energy into making Ghana's association football national team – the Black Stars – a force in African soccer.
 Nickname: The Black Star Line, a shipping industry line incorporated by the founder of the Back-to-Africa movement, civil rights movement leader Marcus Garvey and the organiser of the Universal Negro Improvement Association and African Communities League (UNIA) from 1919 to 1922, gives the Ghana team its nicknames, the Black Stars of West Africa and the Black Stars of Africa.
 Dances: upon the Black Stars scoring against opposition teams, dance forms of the Ghanaian Azonto were performed by Black Stars players in their goal celebrations in match victories at the 2010 World Cup and in 2013, an elite dance version of the Ghanaian Azonto named; "()" (shrimp), was established and showcased at the 2013 Africa Cup of Nations by the Black Stars players. Black Stars goal celebrations in match victories at the 2014 World Cup and upon scoring against opposition teams, are to establish and showcase Alkayida.
 Songs: On occasions of past World Cups or African Championships, a number of musicians with music producers created hiplife football songs which were composed in the Akan language – the 2006 World Cup song, "", (Black Stars, We are moving forward) musical composed by the Musicians Union of Ghana, is to motivate the Black Stars to perform creditably in its quest for the capturing of the World Cup trophy. Black Stars' captain and top-goalscorer Asamoah Gyan recorded and released a Hiplife song with 'Castro The Destroyer', where he features under the alias 'Baby Jet'. The song is entitled "African Girls" and is sung in the Akan language and was launched onto the Ghanaian screens, continental West Africa screens and onto the Sub-Saharan Africa screens. The music video shows the "Asamoah Gyan Dance" goal celebration which he demonstrated at the 2010 World Cup. The song "African Girls" won an award at the Ghana Music Awards in 2011. The 2010 World Cup song, "Ghana Black Stars (Official Song 2010 World Cup)" composed by Ghanaian hiplife music group "Kings and Queens Entertainment" approved by the Ghana Football Association (GFA) as GFA has indicated that the Black Stars are a protected brand.

Fixtures and results

The following is a list of match results from the previous 12 months, as well as any future matches that have been scheduled.

2022

2023

Coaching staff

Coaching history

Since 1957 it has had 32 different head coaches and 3 caretakers. C. K. Gyamfi led the Black Stars to 3 Africa Cup of Nations titles – in 1963, 1965 and 1982 – making Gyamfi the "joint most successful coach" in the competition's history. Fred Osam Duodu led the Black Stars to their 1978 Africa Cup of Nations title; Ratomir Dujković, Milovan Rajevac, and James Kwesi Appiah have led the Black Stars to World Cup qualification. 2 Serbian managers guided Ghana to the 2 first World Cup debuts. The team is being headed by Chris Hugton who is the head coach and supported by George Boateng and Mas-Ud Didi Dramani as assistant coaches of the senior national team, the Black Stars since February 2023.

Players
Current squad
The following players were called up for the 2023 Africa Cup of Nations qualification matches against Angola on 23 and 27 March 2023.

Caps and goals correct as of 2 December 2022, after the match against .

Recent call-ups
The following have also been called up in the past twelve months.

Notes
CNC Cancelled match.
WD Withdrew.
INJ Withdrew because of injury.
PRE Preliminary squad.
RET Retired from international soccer.
SUS Suspended from the team.

 Local team 

The football association of Ghana (GFA) administers national teams at different levels, including 1 for the local national team. The team is restricted to players who only play in the local league, thus the Ghana Premier League. It is nicknamed Local Black Stars.

Records

Players in bold are still active with Ghana.

Most appearances

Top goalscorers

 Captains 

 Awuley Quaye (1978)
 Kuuku Dadzie (1980–1982)
 Emmanuel Quarshie (1982–1984)
 Isaac Paha (1984)
James Kwesi Appiah (1984–1992)
 Abedi Pele (1992–1998)
Charles Akonnor (1999–2001)
 Stephen Appiah (2002–2010)
 John Mensah (2010–2012)
 Asamoah Gyan (2012–2019)
 André Ayew (2019–)

Competitive record
FIFA World Cup

Ghana have qualified for 4 FIFA World Cup tournaments; 2006, 2010, 2014, and 2022. In 2006, it was the only African side to advance to the second round of the World Cup in Germany, and was the 6th nation in a row from Africa to progress beyond the group stages of the World Cup. It had the youngest team in the 2006 edition with an average age of 23 years and 352 days, and were praised for their improving performance. FIFA ranked it 13th out of the 32 countries who competed in the tournament.

In the 2010 World Cup, it progressed beyond the group stages of the World Cup in South Africa, and reached the quarter-finals where it was eliminated by Uruguay. It was defeated on penalty shootout after Luis Suárez hand-balled on the goal line into extra time, preventing a possible winning goal. Of the 32 countries that participated in the 2010 edition, FIFA ranked it 7th.

After beating Egypt 7–3 on aggregate in November 2013, it qualified for the 2014 World Cup in Brazil. It was drawn in Group G with Germany, United States and Portugal. For the first time, it fell in the group stage, tying Germany 2–2 and
losing to the United States and Portugal by 2–1.

{| class="wikitable" style="text-align:center"
!colspan=9|FIFA World Cup record
! style="width:1%;background:white" rowspan=26| 
!colspan=9|Qualification record
|-
!Year
!Round
!Position
!
!
!
!
!
!
!
! 
! 
! 
! 
! 
!Campaign
|-
| 1930
|colspan=8 rowspan=6| Part of   
|colspan=8 rowspan=6| Part of  
|-
| 1934
|-
| 1938
|-
| 1950
|-
| 1954
|-
| 1958
|-
| 1962
|colspan=8|Did not qualify|2
|1
|1
|0
|2
|0
|1962
|-
| 1966
|colspan=8 rowspan=2|Withdrew|colspan=8 rowspan=2|Withdrew|-
| 1970  
|-
| 1974
| colspan=8 rowspan=2| Did not qualify  
|6
|3
|1
|1
|14
|5
|1974 
|-
| 1978
|6
|1
|0
|2
|3
|5
|1978
|-
| 1982
|colspan=8 rowspan=2|Withdrew|colspan=8 rowspan=2|Withdrew|-
| 1986 
|- 
| 1990
|colspan=8 rowspan=4| Did not qualify  
|2
|0
|1
|1
|0
|2
|1990 
|-
| 1994
|4
|2
|0
|2
|4
|3
|1994
|-
| 1998 
|8
|2
|4
|2
|9
|8
|1998
|-
|  2002
|12
|4
|3
|4
|10
|11
|2002 
|-
| 2006
|Round of 16
|13th
|4
|2
|0
|2
|4
|6
|12
|8
|3
|1
|24
|4
|2006 
|-
| 2010
|Quarter-finals
|7th
|5
|2
|2
|1
|5
|4
|12
|8
|1
|3
|20
|8
|2010 
|-
| 2014
|Group stage
|25th
|3
|0
|1
|2
|4
|6
|8
|7
|0
|1
|25
|6
|2014
|-
| 2018
| colspan=8|Did not qualify|8
|2
|5
|1
|9
|5
|2018
|-
| 2022
|Group stage
|24th
|3
|1
|0
|2 
|5
|7
|8
|5
|3
|1
|8
|4
|2022 
|-
|   2026
| colspan=8 |
| colspan=8 |
|-
|style="background:black" colspan=17|
|-
!Total
!Quarter-finals
!4/22
!15
!5
!3
!7
!18
!23
!
!88 
!43 
!22 
!19 
!128 
!61
!Total  
|}

Africa Cup of Nations

It has won the Africa Cup of Nations 4 times – in 1963, 1965, 1978, and 1982 – bettered by Cameroon and Egypt. As the first winner of 3 Nations Cup tournaments, it obtained the right to permanently hold the trophy in 1978. It qualified for the tournament 23 times, finishing as runners-up 5 times, third once, and 4th 4 times. Thus, Ghana has the second-most final game appearances at the tournament behind Egypt (who has 10) with 9. It holds the record of most consecutive semi-final appearances, with 6 straight between 2008 and 2017.*Denotes place was determined via penalty shoot-out.West African Nations Cup and WAFU Nations Cup

West African Nations Cup [SCSA Zone III]

West African Football Union Nations Cup

Olympic Games

 Note: The Gold Coast team established in 1950; country known as Gold Coast then renamed Ghana in 1957, not competing in international tournaments and not being part of neither FIFA nor CAF until 1958, and therefore recognized by the International Olympic Committee (IOC).HonoursLast updated 8 February 2015''IntercontinentalFIFA World CupRound of 16: 2006 FIFA World Cup,
Quarter final: 2010 FIFA World Cup

Continental
 Africa Cup of NationsWinners: 1963, 1965, 1978, 1982
Runners-up: 1968, 1970, 1992, 2010, 2015African Nations Championship Runners-up: 2009, 2014

 African National Team of the Year 
 Winners: 1983, 2006, 2010

Continental subregion
 Nkrumah Cup Winners: 1959, 1960, 1963West African Nations Cup Winners: 1982, 1983, 1984, 1986, 1987CEDEAO Cup Third place: 1991WAFU Nations Cup Winners: 2013, 2017
 Third place: 2010

OtherUgandan Independence TournamentWinners: 1962Pestabola Merdeka Runners up: 1982
 Samuel K. Doe Cup 1986 Runners up: 1986
 Black Stars Tournament 1993 (Libreville, Gabon) Third: 1993
 Great Artificial River Championship 1999 (Libya) Runners up: 1999LG Cup'
 Third: 2003

 FIFA most improved team of the year award 
 Winner: 2005

References

External links

 Ghana Football Association site
 List of International Matches at RSSSF
 GSN 
 At FIFA.com

 
Africa Cup of Nations-winning countries
African national association football teams